Terence Boland Sullivan (born 6 February 1949) is a former Australian politician. He was born in Brisbane. Before entering politics he was a school teacher, and a member of the Queensland Association of Teachers and Independent Schools. In 1981, he joined the Labor. He was elected to the Legislative Assembly of Queensland in 1991 as the member for Nundah, moving to Chermside in 1992 and Stafford in 2001. When Labor won the 1998 state election, Sullivan was appointed Government Whip, a position he held until his retirement from politics in 2006.

References

1949 births
Living people
Members of the Queensland Legislative Assembly
Australian Labor Party members of the Parliament of Queensland
21st-century Australian politicians